Epigodromia is a genus of crabs within the family Dromiidae, that first appeared during the Holocene epoch.

Species 

 Epigodromia acutidens 
 Epigodromia areolata 
 Epigodromia ebalioides 
 Epigodromia gilesii 
 Epigodromia globosa 
 Epigodromia granulata 
 Epigodromia nodosa 
 Epigodromia rotunda 
 Epigodromia rugosa 
 Epigodromia sculpta

References 

Dromiacea
Decapod genera